The 1959 Villanova Wildcats football team represented the Villanova University during the 1959 NCAA University Division football season. The head coach was Frank Regan who left the team after the first four games of the season and Joseph Rogers finished the season. The team played their home games at Villanova Stadium in Villanova, Pennsylvania.

Schedule

References

Villanova
Villanova Wildcats football seasons
Villanova Wildcats football